Acantharctia bivittata is a moth of the family Erebidae. It was described by Arthur Gardiner Butler in 1898. It is found in Kenya.

References

Endemic moths of Kenya
Moths described in 1898
Spilosomina
Moths of Africa